Joshua Steven Schwadron (born December 23, 1981) is an American lawyer and Internet entrepreneur. He is the CEO and co-founder of Mighty, a legal technology company that helps plaintiffs get a better deal from the justice system. He frequently speaks and has been quoted on issues related to empowering plaintiffs in the civil justice system.

Early life and education

Schwadron attended the University of Michigan where in 2003 he was featured in a publication of GQ magazine where it honored him as its national college "Big Man on Campus." The same year, Joshua appeared on the NBC reality TV show "Fear Factor" where he won the two-episode Las Vegas special. After graduating from the Ross School of Business at U of M, Schwadron went on to pursue a career in law, graduating from the Emory University School of Law.

Career

Schwadron is the CEO and founder of Mighty, a legal technology company that helps plaintiffs get a better deal from the justice system.  He frequently speaks and has been quoted on issues related to empowering plaintiffs in the civil justice system.

Previously, he was the founder and CEO of Betterfly, a marketplace that empowered individual service providers to connect directly with their customers. Betterfly raised $4M in venture capital from Lightbank with Eric Lefkofsky and Brad Keywell, co-founders of Groupon, becoming members of the board. Betterfly was sold to TakeLessons in 2013 to coincide with Takelessons expansion into verticals that Betterfly had large presences in.

References 

Living people
Ross School of Business alumni
Emory University alumni
Emory University School of Law alumni
New York (state) lawyers
Florida lawyers
New Jersey lawyers
Reality show winners
Participants in American reality television series
1981 births